The Honduran Patriotic Front (abbreviated FPH) was a coalition of political groups active in Honduras in the early 1980s.

Formed as an alliance of progressive organizations, FPH gathered trade unions, political parties, student movements peasants organizations and professional associations. FPH called for safe-guarding national sovereignty and for protection of human rights. FPH was backed up by the Communist Party of Honduras (PCH), the Marxist-Leninist Communist Party of Honduras (PCMLH), the Christian Democratic Party of Honduras (PDCH) and the Socialist Party of Honduras (PASO). PCH took the initiative to launch FPH in September 1979, with the intention of contesting upcoming elections, following the successes of the Nicaraguan Revolution. The founding leader of FPH was Aníbal Delgado Fiallos, an intellectual connected with the labour movement in northern Honduras. Organizations participating in FPH included Central General de Trabajadores (CGT), the Frente Nacional Campesino Hondureño and the Federación de Estudiantes Universitarios (FEUH).

FPH claimed that there was widespread fraud at the time of the April 1980 Constituent Assembly election, and called for boycott of the polls.

FPH launched a number of candidates for parliament in the 1981 general election in the departments of Yoro, Cortés and Colón. Following the election, under the government of Roberto Suazo Córdova, FPH suffered severe repression and intimidation. Candidates of FPH were kidnapped. As a result of the repression, FPH could not muster sufficient forces to contest in subsequent elections.

References

Defunct left-wing political party alliances
Democratic socialist parties in North America
Political party alliances in Honduras
Honduras